

The Michigan Schools and Government Credit Union (MSGCU) is headquartered in Clinton Township, Michigan, and has a membership size of more than 137,000 and assets of over $3 billion as of December 2021. MSGCU was founded in 1954 and is a not-for-profit financial institution, which is owned and operated by its members. The credit union is regulated under the authority of the National Credit Union Administration (NCUA), which means its members' deposits are federally insured up to $250,000.
Michigan Schools and Government Credit Union currently has 17 branches located throughout Macomb, Oakland, and Wayne counties. It also belongs to the CO-OP Network of ATMs and Credit Union Service Centers. This network allows members to utilize more than 30,000 surcharge-free ATMs and 5,600 Service Centers nationwide.

Membership
MSGCU is open to all who reside, are employed, worship, or attend an educational institution in any county within the State of Michigan.

Awards
The youth and adult financial education programs offered at MSGCU have received the Michigan Credit Union League's (MCUL) Desjardins Financial Education Award numerous times. Additionally, the MCUL has also awarded the credit union with the Louise Herring Award and Dora Maxwell Award for various member and community service efforts throughout the years.

Bauer Financial
, which provides independent bank and credit union star-ratings, has consistently awarded MSGCU with its highest rating, five-stars, for financial institutions.
MSGCU also has high member satisfaction and retention. For the past ten years, MSGCU has received a 96% member satisfaction (or higher) rating during an independent survey performed by D. Hilton Associates Inc. In 2010, Raddon Financial Group ranked MSGCU's member retention rate at 99.5%.

MSGCU was awarded a 2021 Top Workplaces honor by The Detroit Free Press for the ninth year in a row. The Top Workplaces lists are based solely on the results of an employee feedback survey administered by Energage, LLC (formerly Workplace Dynamics), a leading research firm that specializes in organizational health and workplace improvement. Several aspects of workplace culture were measured, including Alignment, Execution, and Connection.

References

Credit unions based in Michigan
Banks established in 1954
1954 establishments in Michigan